The Mari Autonomous Soviet Socialist Republic (Mari ASSR) (Mari: Марий Автоном Совет Социализм Республик, Mariy Avtonom Sovet Sotsializm Respublik) was an autonomous republic of the Russian SFSR, succeeding the Mari Autonomous Oblast. When the Soviet Union disintegrated, the Mari ASSR became the Mari El Republic, a federal subject of the Russian Federation.

History
The Mari Autonomous Soviet Socialist Republic was formed on December 5, 1936 according to the USSR Constitution of 1936 as a result of the transformation of the Mari Autonomous Region, created on November 4, 1920, as an autonomous territorial entity for the mountain and meadow Mari.

On October 22, 1990, by decision of the Supreme Soviet of the Mari ASSR, it was transformed into the Mari Soviet Socialist Republic (MSSR). On May 24, 1991, the Congress of People's Deputies of the RSFSR approved this decision, amending the Constitution of the RSFSR of 1978.

On December 9, 1992, the Congress of People's Deputies of the Russian Federation renamed the Mari SSR into the Republic of Mari El, amending Article 71 of the Constitution of the Russian Federation - Russia. This amendment entered into force from the moment of publication in the "Rossiyskaya Gazeta" on January 12, 1993.

Administrative divisions
The Mari ASSR included 14 regions.

On the territory of the Mari ASSR there were three cities (Yoshkar-Ola, Volzhsk, Kozmodemyansk) and 14 urban-type settlements.

National composition
According to the 1970 census:

Russians - 321,000 (46.9%)
Mari - 299,000 (43.6%)
Tatars - 40,000 (5.8%)
Chuvash - 9,000 (1.3%)
Ukrainians - 5,000 (0.7%)
others - 11,000 (1.7%)

See also
First Secretary of the Mari Communist Party

References

Autonomous republics of the Russian Soviet Federative Socialist Republic
States and territories established in 1936
States and territories disestablished in 1991
1936 establishments in the Soviet Union
1991 disestablishments in the Soviet Union
Former socialist republics